Cotoca is a canton and Municipality of Andrés Ibáñez Province in Santa Cruz Department, Bolivia. The municipality consists of two cantons – Cotoca itself and Puerto Pailas. In 2010 it had an estimated population of 23,951 for the canton and 56,451 for the municipality.

In 1799, the Catholic Church authorised the building of a shrine to the Virgen de Cotoca, an image of Mary (mother of Jesus) that was seen in the town.  The Virgin is now the patron saint of the entire province of Santa Cruz and her feast from 8 to 15 December  draws thousands of Bolivians.

The population increased tenfold in the last forty years:

Politics 

In the Bolivian regional election, 2010, Cotoca placed the Verdes (Bolivia) party of Governor Rubén Costas  first, although by less than the overall result for the province:

References

Populated places in Santa Cruz Department (Bolivia)

it:Cotoca